Mohammad Haris (Urdu,; born 30 March 2001) is a Pakistani International cricketer. 

He made his international debut for the Pakistan national team in June 2022.

Early career
Haris was born in Mushtarzai, a village close to Peshawar, learning cricket in Peshawar's Maazullah Khan Cricket Academy before being selected for the Peshawar Under-19 team and, a year later, for the Under-19 national team.

In December 2019, he was named in Pakistan's squad for the 2020 Under-19 Cricket World Cup.

Domestic career
In October 2020, he made his Twenty20 debut for Khyber Pakhtunkhwa in the 2020–21 National T20 Cup. 

In October 2021, he was named in the Pakistan Shaheens squad for their tour of Sri Lanka. He made his first-class debut during that tour.

In June 2021, he was named as a replacement player in the Karachi Kings' squad following the mini draft for the 2021 PSL, but did not play in any of the team's matches. 

In December 2021, he was signed by Peshawar Zalmi following the players' draft in the supplementary category for the 2022 PSL. 

In February 2022, he made his PSL debut against Karachi Kings at Gaddafi Stadium in Lahore, scoring 49 runs off 27 balls, and winning the man of the match award.

International career
In September 2021, he was named in Pakistan's ODI squad for their series against New Zealand. 

In February 2022, following his performances in the PSL, he was added to Pakistan's reserve list for their Test series against Australia.

In March 2022, Haris was named in Pakistan's ODI and T20I squads for their series against Australia. 

In May 2022, he was named in Pakistan's ODI squad for the series against the West Indies. 

In June 2022, he made his ODI debut against the West Indies. It would also mark his international debut for Pakistan. 

In September 2022, he was named in the Pakistan's T20I squad for the series against England. He made his T20I debut during that series.

References

External links
 

2001 births
Living people
Pashtun people
Pakistani cricketers
Pakistan One Day International cricketers
Pakistan Twenty20 International cricketers
Khyber Pakhtunkhwa cricketers
Karachi Kings cricketers
Peshawar Zalmi cricketers
Cricketers from Peshawar